Pedro Robert (born 11 July 1956) is a Spanish water polo player. He competed at the 1980 Summer Olympics, the 1984 Summer Olympics and the 1988 Summer Olympics.

References

1956 births
Living people
Spanish male water polo players
Olympic water polo players of Spain
Water polo players at the 1980 Summer Olympics
Water polo players at the 1984 Summer Olympics
Water polo players at the 1988 Summer Olympics
Water polo players from Barcelona
20th-century Spanish people